Diuris conspicillata, commonly called the spectacled donkey orchid is a species of orchid which is endemic to the south-west of Western Australia. It is an uncommon species, only found on two coastal granite outcrops, growing in shallow soil pockets.

Description
The flowers have broad, ear-like petals, a short, relatively wide dorsal sepal and hanging, crossed lateral sepals. The labellum is a narrow wedge shape and has three lobes, the lateral ones broad and spreading, and the middle lobe short and flattened. Flowering occurs from August to September.

Taxonomy and naming
Diuris conspicillata was first formally described in 1991 by David Jones and the description was published in Australian Orchid Review. The specific epithet (conspicillata) refers to the markings on the labellum which give the impression of spectacles.

Distribution and habitat
The spectacled donkey orchid is only known from two populations growing in shallow soil pockets on coastal granite outcrops near Esperance.

Conservation
Diuris conspicillata is classified as "not threatened" by the Western Australian Government Department of Parks and Wildlife.

References

conspicillata
Endemic orchids of Australia
Orchids of Western Australia
Endemic flora of Western Australia
Plants described in 1991